Severn Eyre Parker (July 19, 1787 – October 21, 1836) was a nineteenth-century politician and lawyer from Virginia, United States.

Biography
Born near Eastville, Virginia, Parker attended the common schools as a child. He studied law and was admitted to the bar. He became a member of the Virginia House of Delegates, serving from 1809 to 1812. He was appointed deputy clerk of Northampton County, Virginia on March 8, 1813 and was captain of a rifle company in 1814.

Parker served in the Virginia State Senate from 1817 to 1820 and was elected a Democratic-Republican to the United States House of Representatives in 1818, serving from 1819 to 1821. He returned to the House of Delegates in 1828, 1829 and from 1834 to 1836.

Parker died on October 21, 1836 in Northampton County, Virginia and was interred in a private cemetery on Kendall Grove Farm near Eastville, Virginia.

External links

1787 births
1836 deaths
Members of the Virginia House of Delegates
Virginia state senators
Virginia lawyers
County clerks in Virginia
People from Eastville, Virginia
Democratic-Republican Party members of the United States House of Representatives from Virginia
19th-century American politicians
19th-century American lawyers